Gellibrand may refer to:

Places
 Division of Gellibrand, an Australian federal electoral division in Victoria
 Gellibrand, Victoria, town in Australia

Other uses
 Gellibrand (surname)
 Gellibrand River